Jakob Glerup Nielsen (born April 20, 1975) is a former Danish football midfielder, who played for Viborg FF his entire career. During his time in Viborg FF, he was known for his hard-working attitude, but hardly ever scoring goals. When eventually scoring a goal he always celebrated it with high levels of enthusiasm.

He retired in the summer of 2010 at the age of 35. The last season of his career his club Viborg FF played in the Danish 1st Division (second best league).

External links

Danish national team profile
Career statistic at Danmarks Radio

Living people
1975 births
Danish men's footballers
Denmark under-21 international footballers
Association football midfielders
Aalborg Chang players
Viborg FF players
People from Køge Municipality
Sportspeople from Region Zealand